British Troll Farm is a radio sitcom written and created by Jack Bernhardt and directed and produced by David Tyler. It is set in a secret British military unit just off the A23, dedicated to fighting the social media cyberwar. Badly. 

The pilot was first broadcast on BBC Radio 4 in July 2019  and was well received on social media. The Cambridge Geek gave it 4 stars. 

The cast included Nicola Coughlan as Caz, Daniel Ings as Josh, Steve Edge as Phil, Tala Gouveia as Bim, and Ewan Bailey as the narrator.

References 

British radio comedy